USS Fortune may refer to the following ships of the United States Navy:

 was a screw steamer launched in March 1865 and sold in 1922
 was acquired by the US Navy in February 1944 and decommissioned in 1945

United States Navy ship names